Nicoletta Tozzi (born 3 January 1966) is a former Italian middle-distance runner who currently holds a national record with the relay national team.

Biography
She won 9 national championships at senior level.

National records
 4x800 metres relay: '8:18.3 ( Sheffield, 5 June 1992) - with Nadia Falvo, Stefania Savi, Fabia Trabaldo - current holder.

Achievements

National titles
Italian Athletics Championships
800 m: 1984, 1986, 1987, 1988, 1989, 1990, 1993 (7)
Italian Athletics Indoor Championships
800 m: 1993, 1994 (2)

See aldo
 List of Italian records in athletics

References

External links
 

1966 births
Living people
People from Cesena
Italian female middle-distance runners
Athletes (track and field) at the 1987 Mediterranean Games
Athletes (track and field) at the 1993 Mediterranean Games
Competitors at the 1987 Summer Universiade
Competitors at the 1989 Summer Universiade
Competitors at the 1991 Summer Universiade
Competitors at the 1993 Summer Universiade
Mediterranean Games competitors for Italy
Sportspeople from the Province of Forlì-Cesena